Aerography is the production of weather charts. The information is supplied by radiosonde observations, principally. Constant-pressure charts are routinely constructed at standard air pressures. Standard air pressures are 850, 700, 500, 400, 300, 250, and 200 millibars (hectopascals) (hPa) (SI). Weather charts are sometimes drawn at lower air pressures that occur above 40,000 feet (12 km). The lines of equal air pressure are called isobars. Isotherms are the lines of equal air temperature.

Weather prediction